Bright Future was a liberal political party in Iceland founded in 2012.

The party was a member of the Alliance of Liberals and Democrats for Europe (ALDE) party and had links to the ALDE Group in the European Parliament, although it resigned its membership of ALDE in October 2019.

History 
The party was founded on 4 February 2012. Before the 2013 general election, it included two Members of Parliament, Guðmundur Steingrímsson (who defected from the Progressive Party) and Róbert Marshall (who defected from the Social Democratic Alliance).  Guðmundur had been elected as a candidate of the Progressive Party, but left the party to sit as an independent. In 2012, Guðmundur formed Bright Future with the Best Party, with which it shares initials in Icelandic, "BF." The party was formed to contest the April 2013 parliamentary election. The party won six seats, making it the fifth largest in parliament, but has since dropped significantly in opinion polls. The party lost all of its Althing seats in the 2017 election. The party did not present any lists in the 2021 parliamentary elections.

Ideology 
The party supported Iceland joining the European Union and adopting the euro as Iceland's national currency.

Electoral results

Chairpersons

References

External links 
 

Political parties established in 2012
2012 establishments in Iceland
Green liberalism
Liberal parties in Iceland
Pro-European political parties in Iceland
Defunct political parties in Iceland